Computer science education in the United Kingdom is carried out in the UK mostly from the age from 11, with most computer scientists needing a university degree also; from 11 and beyond, it is a predominantly male subject.

In their teenage years, around 3% of girls are interested in computing as a career, as opposed to 17% of boys.

History

1980s
Secondary schools taught logic, hardware and binary up to the age of 16 together with the programming language BASIC.

1990s
Computer science was taught much less across schools up to 16. Computer science was largely only taught from 16 to 18.

2000s
Computer science was infrequently taught in schools up to the age of 16.

2010s
The 2010 general election would result in a swift change in education policy on computer science education across England. The subject had not been taught as widespread as it could have been, and much more emphasis would now be placed on developing hard-core computing skills, and for primary schools too.

In January 2012 the Royal Society published a report entitled Shut down or restart? The way forward for computing in UK schools. Also in 2012, Code Club was founded; another group initiative is CoderDojo.

From 2014 a new PGCE in Computing has been offered by UK universities.

From September 2014 in England, computing teaching was now compulsory from the age of 5. Computer science GCSE and A levels have been made more rigorous. From around 2014 the new Computing GCSE has been taken.

In November 2018 the government-funded National Centre for Computing Education was founded at the University of York, to coordinate training for computing teachers in England.

The Institute of Coding was launched in 2018.

Nations

England

Computing teaching is mandatory at English schools from ages 5-16. There are around 438,000 teachers in England, with around 18,000 computing teachers; only around 35% have a relevant degree.

Scotland

Education Scotland introduced its Curriculum for Excellence -Technologies in 2010. Secondary school starts at the age of 12 in Scotland.

Wales

Wales introduced its Curriculum for Life in September 2018.

Northern Ireland

The Northern Ireland Curriculum features computer science to a lesser extent than now found in England.

Primary education
There are around 21,000 primary schools across the UK. 

Teaching applications at primary level are Scratch, PICAXE, Micro Bit and Kodu Game Lab.

Secondary education
There are approximately 4,000 secondary schools throughout the UK. 

Secondary schools develop applications most (21%) in Python, followed by Scratch (19%).

There are around 20% female candidates of Computing GCSE, with around 65,000 total candidates in 2017. Four times the proportion of girls choose computing GCSE at girls schools, as opposed to girls at co-educational secondary schools.

Computing teachers
Teacher development is offered through the Computing At School Network of Excellence, run by universities.

Sixth form

9% of Computing A-level candidates are female. In 2017 there were around 8,300 total candidates. Numbers of candidates went down from around 5,600 in 2007 to around 3,800 in 2012, but numbers have been steadily rising since 2012.

For Scotland, Advanced Highers Computing has 14% female candidates. In 2017 there were around 650 total Computing candidates.

University
For English universities around 12% of first degree entrants are female.

There are around 500 applications a year for UCAS Teacher Training in Computing.

Around 16,500 applied to study computing at university in 2003; by 2007 it was around 10,600.

Publications
 CS4FN, published twice a year, goes to over 2,000 secondary schools.

See also
 Mathematics education in the United Kingdom

References

External links
 Computing at School
 Institute of Coding

Computer science education in the United Kingdom